Kadaikutty Singam is a 2018 Indian Tamil-language action drama film written and directed by Pandiraj and produced by Suriya on his studio 2D Entertainment. The film features an ensemble cast of  Karthi, Sayyeshaa, Sathyaraj, Soori, Viji Chandrasekhar, Bhanupriya, Deepa Shankar, Priya Bhavani Shankar and Arthana Binu. The film's music was composed by D. Imman and the cinematographer was by Velraj. The film was released on 13 July 2018 to mixed reviews.

Plot 
Perunazhi Gunasingam (Karthi) is a modern-day rich farmer who lives happily with his family and father Perunazhi Ranasingam (Sathyaraj).

30 years ago, Ranasingam always wanted a son but kept getting daughters. After four daughters with his first wife Vanavan Madevi (Viji Chandrasekhar), Ranasingam sought after a new bride, to beget a son. Afraid of losing her status to a stranger, Vanavan arranged a marriage between Ranasingam and her younger sister, Panchavan Madhevi (Bhanupriya). Five months after Panchavan became pregnant, Ranasingam's eldest daughter Mangamma Rani (Mounika) became pregnant out of wedlock and Ranasingam's family arranged her marriage to her boyfriend, Thamarai Manala Sendayar (Saravanan). With both the stepdaughter and stepmother pregnant, odds went against Ranasingam as Panchavan gave birth to a girl while his elder daughter had a boy. Ranasingam was heartbroken and stopped worrying for a boy child.

8 years later, Vanavan became accidentally pregnant and finally gave birth to a boy, who was named Gunasingam. At the present, Gunasingam is a 27-year-old, 10th graduate, and a contented and happy farmer who practices natural farming and lives in peace. His concerns are:

1. His eldest sister's husband Thamarai and next sister's husband Malligai Manala Sendayar have been at loggerheads for a decade, despite being blood brothers. This is due to a court feud over inheritance and is complicated by the fact that Malligai has no pregnancy.

2. He must decide whether to marry either Poompozhil Chellamma (daughter of his third sister) or Aandal Priyadarshini (daughter of his only step-sister), as it is a societal norm in Tamil Nadu, for a man to marry his elder sister's daughter in rural areas.

However, problems arise when Gunasingam falls head over heels for Kannukiniyal "Iniya", the daughter of a rich man named Thillainayagam whose sister Ranasingam had suddenly left during engagement to oversee birth of his fourth daughter. Despite resistance from Iniya's family, Ranasingam agrees to the match under the condition that Gunasingam must convince his sisters that he cannot marry their daughters. Also, Iniya's uncle Kodiyarasu was jailed by the work of Gunasingam and seeks to get revenge by killing him. When Chellamma learns of Gunasingam's decision, she attempts suicide but is saved.

Panchavan vacates Ranasingam's house because she feels that her elder sister continuously commits injustices against her, like arranging her marriage without her permission, getting Panchavan's only daughter married to an ill drunkard who died within a year, and now refusing to marry her granddaughter Andal to Gunasingam. As revenge, Kodiyarasu offers to marry Chellamma, and that offer is accepted. Also, Thamarai is willing to attend the marriage only if his brother does not, and the same is the case with Malligai. Finally, Gunasingam gathers all his relatives to his grandmother's function and convinces them after a moving speech. Later, Kodiyarasu is thrashed by Gunasingam and returned to prison. Meanwhile, Gunasingam's brothers-in-law amend their dispute and everyone attends Gunasingam's wedding to Iniya.

A year later, Gunasingam and Iniya give birth to a girl and choose to adapt to permanent birth control to ensure that past events do not repeat themselves.

Cast 

 Karthi as Perunazhi Gunasingam (Kadaikutty Singam)
 Sathyaraj as Perunazhi Ranasingam, Gunasingam's father
 Bhanupriya as Panchavan Madhevi, Ranasingam's second wife and Vanavan Madevi's sister
 Viji Chandrasekhar as Vanavan Madevi, Ranasingam's first wife
 Soori as Sivagamiyin Selvan, Mangamma's Son
 Sayyeshaa as Kannukiniyal "Iniya", Gunasingam's love interest 
 Arthana Binu as Aandal Priyadarshini, Padmavathi's daughter
 Priya Bhavani Shankar as Poompozhil Chellamma, Samyuktha's Daughter 
 Saroja as Sembiyan Madevi Vaanavan Madevi and Panchavan Madevi's mother
 Mounika as Mangamma Rani (Sathi Leelavathi/Saamiyadi), Ranasingam's first daughter
 Saravanan  as Thamarai Manala Sendayar, Mangamma's husband and 1st son-in-law of Ranasingam
 Deepa Shankar as Velunachiar Rani (Sandakozhi/Action King), Ranasingam's second daughter
 G. Marimuthu as Malligai Manala Sendayar, Thamarai Manala Sendayar's brother, Velunachiyar's husband and second son-in-law of Ranasingam
 Yuvarani as Samyuktha Rani (Ratha Kanneer), Ranasingam's third daughter
 Ilavarasu as Manikkam, Samyuktha's husband and third son-in-law of Ranasingam
 Jeevitha as Jhansi Rani (Ulavuthurai), Ranasingam's fourth daughter
 Sriman as Adhiyamaan Nedunkili (Safari), Jhansirani's husband and fourth son-in-law of Ranasingam
 Indhumathi as Padmavathi Rani (Paasa Malar), Ranasingam's fifth daughter born for Panchavan Madevi
 Ponvannan as Thillainayagam, Iniya's father
 Shatru as Kodiyarasu
 Manoj Kumar as Gunasingam's teacher who work as an accountant at Ranasingam's house
 John Vijay as MLA, Gunasingam's spy in enemy's gang
 Manobala as Judge
 Soundararaja as Kodimaran, Kodiyarasu's brother
 Veerasamar as Kodaiyarasu's right-hand man
 Senthi Kumari as Thillainayagam's sister
 Tanushree as Jhansi Rani's daughter
 Rithik as Jhansi Rani's son
 Thamizh as Teacher's grandson
 Krishnamoorthy as Bus conductor
 Suriya in a special appearance as himself
 Velraj in a special appearance
 Rajsekar Karpura Sundara Pandian in a special appearance

Production 
In June 2017, Suriya signed on director Pandiraj to make a film for his studio 2D Entertainment, which would feature Karthi in a lead role. Pandiraj revealed that Karthi would play the role of a passionate farmer and the only male child in a family with five elder sisters. The director succeeded in convincing Sathyaraj to play the character of Karthi's father, while he cast Sayyeshaa as the main female lead despite initial reservations whether she would aptly portray a village character. The makers held talks with Anupama Parameswaran for a Second leading female role, but later selected Priya Bhavani Shankar. Arthana Binu was signed to portray another leading female role.
Other actors selected for the film included Soori, Bhanupriya, Yuvarani, Mounika, Viji Chandrasekhar and Ponvannan.

The shoot of the film began on 9 November 2017 in Chennai, with the cast and crew assembling for a launch ceremony. In early January 2018, the team moved to continue the shoot in Thenkasi and Puliyankudi. The film ran into trouble with Animal Welfare Board of India (AWBI) when the team shot a rekla (bullock cart race) scene sequence in spite of AWBI denying permission. The producers had previously approached the AWBI for permission to shoot the scene which involved 211 cows and oxen, 48 cocks and 32 birds. The board, however, denied permission citing that the Supreme Court has banned the sport. The breach had come to light after Suriya had uploaded a video of him and his son visiting the shoot location in Karaikudi. Rajasekar Pandian, a manager of 2D Entertainment, later said that the team got the required permission from the District Collector of Pudukottai, who permitted the president of the Rekla Federation of Tamil Nadu to conduct the race. So, the makers chose to use the opportunity of the race to include such scenes of rekla racing in the film.

The promotion of the film also proceeded by actor Karthi and Soori in the ongoing reality TV series Bigg Boss Tamil 2.

Release
The satellite rights of the film were sold to STAR Vijay. China Babu(Telugu Version Of Kadaikutty Singham) the satellite rights of the film were sold to Zee Telugu.

Reception

Critical Response 
Ashameera Aiyappan of The Indian Express gave the film 2.5 out of 5 stars and wrote "Kadaikutty Singam was also branded as the film that would ‘inspire’ youngsters to take up farming. In a growing trend, several films seem to bear the pressure of delivering a social message. And in the process, they tend to oversimplify social issues that are intricately layered. It is easy to call yourself a proud farmer when you earn in lakhs from harvests and belong to a family that can feed 50 people daily. Kadaikutty Singam is about Guna Singam, who happens to be a farmer and his extended family. And Pandiraj ensures that it is a family that we don't get to see often." Thinkal Menon of The Times of India gave the film 3 out of 5 stars and wrote "Karthi steals the show as a proud farmer who is hopeful of the state of agriculture in the country. As a down to earth family man, who preaches about the greatness of farming and the need to embrace it, the role has given him another chance to showcase his acting prowess. Soori's comedy comes as a relief at many places in the film which is a bit over loaded with family sentiments. The heroines are okay while Sathyaraj, Ilavarasu, Bhanupriya and other artistes play their part well. Imman's music and Velraj's cinematography enhance the storytelling at several situations, while editing could have been much better." Priyanka Sundar of Hindustan Times gave the film 2 out of 5 stars and wrote "Kadaikutty Singham is a film that set out to explore the dynamics of a joint family in a rural village in Tamil Nadu, but ended up becoming a messy affair that tried to do it all." Behindwoods gave the film's rating 2.75 out of 5 stars and stated "Kadaikutty Singam scores high on emotions, dialogues and performances. Try watching it along with your family!"

Box office 
According to trade sources, the film grossed  in just two weeks in Tamil Nadu and continued to run to packed houses.

Soundtrack 

The soundtrack was composed by D. Imman, making his first collaboration with Karthi and director Pandiraj. The soundtrack rights were acquired by Sony Music. The album features eight songs, with three karaoke versions. The audio launch for the film was held on 11 June 2018. After the film's release, the makers released five more songs as bonus tracks on 16 July 2018.

Awards and nominations

References

External links 
 

2018 films
2010s Tamil-language films
2018 action drama films
Indian action drama films
Films scored by D. Imman
Films about farmers
Indian family films